James Thomas Hammill Regan (June 29, 1855 – 1927) was a farmer, merchant and political figure in Ontario. He represented Wentworth South in the Legislative Assembly of Ontario from 1911 to 1919 as a Conservative member.

He was born in Chatham, the son of James Regan and Sarah Hammill, and was educated in Ancaster and Dundas. Regan was married twice: first to Alferetta Templer in 1884 and then to Kate Alma Gabel in 1898. He ran unsuccessfully for a seat in the assembly in 1905 and 1908. Regan later served as sheriff for Wentworth County.

References

External links

1835 births
1927 deaths
Progressive Conservative Party of Ontario MPPs
People from Chatham-Kent
Canadian farmers
Canadian sheriffs
Canadian merchants